The presidency of Herbert Hoover began on March 4, 1929, when Herbert Hoover was inaugurated as the 31st president of the United States, and ended on March 4, 1933.

1929

March 1929 
 March 4 – The inauguration of Herbert Hoover takes place. He identifies crime as his primary concern as president.
 March 5 – Hoover determines that the embargo on arms shipments to Mexico should not be adjusted.
 March 6 – Herbert Lord is retained by Hoover as Director of the Bureau of the Budget.
 March 12 – Hoover declares a policy of conserving oil fields in all cases permitted by law.
 March 25 – Hoover abolishes the White House stables.
 March 26 – Hoover demands an end to the abuse of patronage by Republicans in Southern states.
 March 27 – Hoover has a telephone installed at his desk.
 March 28 – Henry L. Stimson takes office as Hoover's Secretary of State, replacing Frank B. Kellogg.

April 1929 
 April 4 – Lou Henry Hoover becomes the first woman to operate an automobile as First Lady.
 April 6 – Hoover travels to Shenandoah National Park to consider it as a presidential campsite.
 April 10 – It is determined that the sister of Vice President Charles Curtis may hold a diplomatic status equivalent of Second Lady of the United States.
 April 14 – Hoover speaks at the Gridiron Club dinner.
 April 15 – Congress meets in a special session convened by Hoover.
 April 16 – Hoover delivers a message to Congress requesting the creation of a federal farm board.
 April 17 – Hoover pitches the first ball of the 1929 Major League Baseball season.
 April 21 – Hoover declares opposition to a debenture plan on exports in the pending farm bill.
 April 22 – Hoover asks reporters to support law enforcement in an address during the annual Associated Press luncheon.
 April 25 – The American Association of Engineering Societies awards Hoover the John Fritz Medal.
 April 26 – Hoover endorses a plan to reconstruct Washington, D.C. during a meeting at the Chamber of Commerce.
 April 30 – Hoover signs an appropriations bill as the first bill of his presidency.

May 1929 
 May 2 – Hoover hosts a luncheon with 47 business leaders.
 May 2 – Hoover fires United States Attorney William A De Groot after he refuses to resign.
 May 8 – Hoover meets with Goodyear president Paul W. Litchfield to discuss the development of dirigible mail carriers.
 May 11 – Hoover designates the Mount of the Holy Cross as a national monument.
 May 12 – Hoover invites Senators William Borah and Simeon D. Fess to the White House to negotiate a compromise on the farm bill.
 May 14 – Hoover raises tariffs on flaxseed, milk, cream, and window glass.
 May 18 – Hoover announces that American facilitation of the territorial dispute between Chile and Peru have been successful.
 May 20 – The United States endorses a plan to be more lenient in collection of German war reparations.
 May 20 – Hoover establishes the Wickersham Commission to investigate the status of Prohibition in the United States.
 May 27 – The Supreme Court rules that the president has the power of pocket veto in the Pocket Veto Case.
 May 28 – The Wickersham Commission has its first meeting at the White House.
 May 30 – Hoover urges acceptance of the Kellogg–Briand Pact while giving a Memorial Day speech at Arlington National Cemetery.

June 1929 
 June 3 – The Treaty of Lima is signed by Chile and Peru following negotiations hosted by the United States.
 June 11 – Hoover urges the Senate to vote in favor of the Agricultural Marketing Act of 1929.
 June 12 – First Lady Lou Henry Hoover hosts Jessie De Priest for tea at the White House.
 June 15 – Hoover signs the Agricultural Marketing Act of 1929 into law.
 June 21 – U.S. Ambassador to Mexico Dwight Morrow arbitrates the end of the Cristero War.
 June 25 – Hoover signs the Boulder Canyon Project Act into law, funding the Boulder Dam.

July 1929 
 July 8 – Hoover appoints Dwight F. Davis as Governor-General of the Philippines.
 July 15 – Hoover presides over the first Federal Farm Board meeting.
 July 27 – Hoover forwards a statement to the White House, expressing appreciation for the debt funding agreement in the French debt settlement.
 July 28 – Hoover returns to Washington, D.C.
 July 29 – Hoover addresses the first meeting of a conference on child health and protection planning committee.

August 1929 
 August 10 – Hoover hosts high profile guests at Rapidan Camp to celebrate his 55th birthday.
 August 27 – The United States signs the Kellogg–Briand Pact.

September 1929 
 September 18 – Hoover expresses support for arms reduction during a radio broadcast.

October 1929 
 October 4–5 – Ramsay MacDonald meets with Hoover to discuss arms reduction.
 October 21 – Hoover dedicates the Edison Institute of Technology.
 October 24 – The Wall Street Crash of 1929 begins.
 October 25 – Hoover assures the American people that the economy is still strong.
 October 29 – The Wall Street Crash continues as "Black Tuesday" occurs.

November 1929 
 November 18 – Incumbent Secretary of War James William Good dies at the age of 63.
 November 21 – Hoover holds a conference with business and labor leaders.
 November 23 – Hoover requests that state governors increase public works projects in their states.

December 1929 
 December 2 – Hoover demands an end to the Sino-Soviet conflict.
 December 3 – Hoover delivers the 1929 State of the Union Address and declares his belief that the worst of the Great Depression is over.
 December 6 – U.S. Marines fire on Haitian protesters during the United States occupation of Haiti.
 December 9 – Patrick J. Hurley takes office as Secretary of War.
 December 14 – Hoover orders the release of Communist Party members that had been arrested for congregating without a permit.
 December 24 – The West Wing of the White House is damaged in a fire. Hoover returns to the White House to oversee the salvaging of important documents.

1930

January 1930

February 1930 
 February 3 – Hoover nominates Charles Evans Hughes as Chief Justice of the United States.
 February 28 – The Forbes Commission arrives in Haiti to develop a strategy to end the occupation of the country.

March 1930 
 March 7 – Hoover states his belief that the Great Depression is nearing its end.
 March 8 – Chief Justice and former president William Howard Taft dies at the age of 72. Hoover declares 30 days of mourning.
 March 21 – Hoover nominates John J. Parker as a Supreme Court justice.

April 1930 
 April 16 – Lou Henry Hoover suffers a severe back injury after a fall at the White House.
 April 22 – The United States along with several other countries recognizes the Spanish Republic.
 April 28 – Hoover makes a statement to Congress recommending improvements to criminal law enforcement.

May 1930 
 May 7 – Hoover's nomination of John J. Parker to the Supreme Court is rejected by the Senate.
 May 9 – Hoover nominates Owen Roberts as a Supreme Court justice.
 May 28 – Hoover vetoes a bill that would expand pensions for Spanish–American War veterans.

June 1930 
 June 2 – Congress overrides Hoover's veto and expands pensions for Spanish–American War veterans.
 June 14 – The Federal Bureau of Narcotics is established within the Department of the Treasury.
 June 17 – Hoover signs the Smoot–Hawley Tariff Act into law.

July 1930 
 July 3 – Hoover signs the Veterans Administration Act, authorizing the formation of the Veterans' Administration.
 July 7 – Construction on the Hoover Dam begins.
 July 7 – Hoover urges the Senate to ratify the London Naval Treaty.
 July 21 – Hoover establishes the Veterans' Administration.

August 1930 
 August 5 – Hoover appoints Douglas MacArthur as Chief of Staff of the United States Army.
 August 14 – Hoover meets with 13 governors to discuss drought relief.

September 1930

October 1930

November 1930 
 November 4 – The 1930 United States elections take place and Republicans lose control of the House of Representatives.

December 1930 
 December 2 – Hoover requests funding for public works projects during the 1930 State of the Union Address.
 December 9 – William N. Doak takes office as Hoover's Secretary of Labor, replacing James J. Davis.
 December 20 – Hoover signs a bill authorizing $155 million of aid for public works and drought relief.
 December 23 – Hoover pardons former Indiana governor Warren T. McCray.
 December 30 – Hoover establishes the Colonial National Monument.
 December 31 – The Battle of Achuapa takes place in Nicaragua.

1931

January 1931 
 January 6 – Hoover speaks to the National Automobile Chamber of Commerce.
 January 20 – Hoover releases the findings of the Wickersham Commission.
 January 30 – Hoover meets with R. B. Bennett at the White House.

February 1931 
 February 26 – Hoover vetoes the Emergency Adjusted Compensation Bill.
 February 27 – Congress overrides Hoover's veto of the Emergency Adjusted Compensation Bill.

March 1931 
 March 3 – Hoover signs the Davis–Bacon Act of 1931 into law.
 March 4 – Hoover signs a bill that establishes The Star-Spangled Banner as the national anthem of the United States of America.

April 1931

May 1931 
 May 11 – Creditanstalt declares bankruptcy.

June 1931 
 June 20 – Hoover issues the Hoover Moratorium.

July 1931

August 1931

September 1931 
 September 29 – Britain abandons the gold standard.

October 1931 
 October 22 – Hoover meets with Prime Minister of France Pierre Laval at the White House.

November 1931 
 November 11 – Hoover dedicates the District of Columbia War Memorial.
 November 16 – Hoover meets with Italian Minister of Foreign Affairs Dino Grandi.

December 1931 
 December 7 – Hoover turns away the hunger march at the White House.
 December 8 – Hoover delivers the 1931 State of the Union Address.

1932

January 1932 
 January 7 – The United States declares its refusal to recognize territories occupied by the Empire of Japan.
 January 22 – Hoover establishes the Reconstruction Finance Corporation.

February 1932 
 February 12 – Ogden L. Mills takes office as Hoover's Secretary of the Treasury, replacing Andrew Mellon.
 February 15 – Hoover nominates Benjamin N. Cardozo as a Supreme Court justice.
 February 22 – Hoover honors the bicentennial of George Washington's birthday in a joint session of Congress.
 February 27 – Hoover signs the Glass–Steagall Act of 1932 into law.
 February 29 – Hoover appoints Theodore Roosevelt Jr. as Governor-General of the Philippines.

March 1932 
 March 1 – The Lindbergh kidnapping takes place.

April 1932 
 April 7 – Hoover vetoes an increase to veterans' pensions.

May 1932 
 May 9 – Hoover vetoes a bill that would grant access to old soldiers' home for civilians of the Quartermaster Corps.

June 1932 
 June 6 – Hoover signs the Revenue Act of 1932 into law.
 June 16 – The Republican Party nominates Hoover as its candidate for the 1932 United States presidential election.
 June 22 – Hoover submits disarmament proposals at the Conference for the Reduction and Limitation of Armaments.

July 1932 
 July 21 – Hoover signs the Emergency Relief and Construction Act into law.
 July 22 – Hoover signs the Federal Home Loan Bank Act into law.
 July 28 – Hoover orders the United States Army to clear Bonus Army protestors from Washington, D.C.

August 1932 
 August 8 – Roy D. Chapin takes office as Hoover's Secretary of Commerce, replacing Robert P. Lamont.
 August 11 – Hoover changes his stance on prohibition, saying it should be left to the states.

September 1932 
 September 26 – The Battle of Agua Carta takes place in Nicaragua.

October 1932

November 1932 
 November 8 – Hoover loses the 1932 presidential election to the Governor of New York, Franklin D. Roosevelt in a landslide election.
 November 22 – Hoover meets with president-elect Franklin D. Roosevelt.

December 1932 
 December 6 – Hoover delivers the 1932 State of the Union Address.
 December 26 – The Battle of El Sauce takes place in Nicaragua.

1933

January 1933 
 January 2 – Hoover orders an end to the United States occupation of Nicaragua.
 January 13 – Hoover vetoes the Hare–Hawes–Cutting Act.
 January 17 – Congress overrides Hoover's veto of the Hare–Hawes–Cutting Act.
 January 23 – The Twentieth Amendment to the United States Constitution moved the beginning and ending of the terms of the president and vice president from March 4 to January 20, and of members of Congress from March 4 to January 3. It also has provisions that determine what is to be done when there is no president-elect.
 January 30 – Adolf Hitler takes power in Germany.

February 1933 
 February 11 – Hoover establishes Death Valley as a national monument.
 February 13 – Hoover delivers a farewell address at the Waldorf-Astoria Hotel.
 February 20 – The Blaine Act is passed, moving the United States toward repeal of Prohibition.
 February 25 – The first aircraft carrier of the United States Navy, the USS Ranger (CV-4), is christened by Lou Henry Hoover.

March 1933 
 March 2 – Hoover designates the Morristown National Historical Park as the country's first national historical park.
 March 3 – Hoover dedicates Mount Rushmore as a national memorial.
 March 3 – Hoover signs the Buy American Act into law.
 March 4 – Franklin D. Roosevelt is inaugurated as the 32nd president of the United States.

See also
 Timeline of the Calvin Coolidge presidency, for his predecessor
 Timeline of the Franklin D. Roosevelt presidency, for his successor

References

External links 
 Herbert Hoover Presidential Library Timeline
 Miller Center Hoover Presidential Timeline

1929 in the United States
1930 in the United States
1931 in the United States
1932 in the United States
1933 in the United States
Hoover, Herbert